Meri Maa is an Indian television drama series which aired on Life OK in from 18 December 2011 to 22 April 2012.

Plot 

Young Jhilmil was lost at her young age in a festival, better to say she was abducted. Then she was raised in a slums with other kids. Jhilmil's real mother mourns for the loss of her daughter but her mother-in-law thinks she is responsible of this abduction and loss.

Cast 
Sayantani Ghosh as Pratibha
Avneet Kaur as Jhilmil
Neena Kulkarni
Jatin Shah
Parikshit Sahni
Ketaki Kadam
Shahab Khan 
Shivam Jagtap as Bhola

Adaptations

References 

2011 Indian television series debuts
2012 Indian television series endings
Indian television series
Indian television soap operas
Indian drama television series
Life OK original programming